
Year 458 BC was a year of the pre-Julian Roman calendar. At the time, it was known as the Year of the Consulship of Rutilus and Carvetus (or, less frequently, year 296 Ab urbe condita). The denomination 458 BC for this year has been used since the early medieval period, when the Anno Domini calendar era became the prevalent method in Europe for naming years.

Events 
 By place 
 Greece 
 Pleistoanax succeeds  Pleistarchus as king of Sparta.
 Pericles continues Ephialtes' democratising activities by making the archonship a paid office and the lower class of Athenian citizens eligible to hold the office.
 The Athenians start constructing the Long Walls to protect the route from the main city to their main port (Piraeus).
 Aegina joins the Peloponnesian alliance, but their combined fleet is defeated by the Athenians in the Battle of Aegina. The Athenians, under the command of Leocrates, land on the island of Aegina and besiege and defeat the city.  Aegina is forced to pay tribute to Athens.

 Roman Republic 
 The Roman general Lucius Quinctius Cincinnatus is summoned by the Roman Senate to defend the city from attack by the approaching Aequi. He is named dictator of Rome for six months. He goes on to defeat the enemy in a single day at the Battle of Mount Algidus and celebrates a triumph in Rome. Sixteen days after the battle, he resigns his dictatorship and returns to his farm.

 By topic 
 Literature 
 The Athenian playwright Aeschylus completes his trilogy The Oresteia (which comprise Agamemnon, Choephoroi (The Libation Bearers) and The Eumenides).

Births

Deaths 
 Pleistarchus, King of Sparta since 480 BC

References